Slumber is a 2017 British supernatural horror-thriller film directed by Jonathan Hopkins and co-written by Richard Hobley and Hopkins. It stars Maggie Q, Kristen Bush, Sam Troughton, Will Kemp,  William Hope and Sylvester McCoy.

It was released on December 1, 2017, by Vertical Entertainment.

Premise 
Alice (Maggie Q) is a rationally minded sleep doctor, who is forced to abandon scientific reason when she meets a family being terrorised by a parasitic demon known as the nocnitsa which paralyses victims as they sleep.

Production 
Slumber was filmed at Home Farm in Kent and doubled as the Morgan family home. Production used exterior and interior shots at the location.

Additional external shots from Yorktown Heights, and Pound Ridge, New York.

Cast 
 Maggie Q as Alice Arnolds
 Kristen Bush as Sarah Morgan
 Sam Troughton as Charlie Morgan
 Lucas Bond as Daniel Morgan
 Honor Kneafsey as Emily Morgan
 Will Kemp as Tom Arnolds
 William Hope as Malcom
 Sylvester McCoy as Amado
 Sophia Wiseman as Niamh (daughter of Alice)
 Neil Linpow as Dave Marklund
 William Rhead as Liam

Release
In May 2017, Vertical Entertainment acquired distribution rights to the film.

Reception 
On review aggregator website Rotten Tomatoes, the film holds an approval rating of 0% based on 8 reviews, with an average rating of 3.25/10.

References

External links

2017 films
2017 horror films
British horror films
Vertical Entertainment films
Films about sleep disorders
Demons in film
2010s English-language films
2010s British films